The 53rd Test and Evaluation Group is a group of the United States Air Force. It is a part of the 53rd Wing, and is headquartered at Nellis AFB, Nevada.

The Group was originally activated in 1942 as the 79th Pursuit Group (Interceptor), becoming the 79th Fighter Group (Single Engine) a few months later.  Later that year it moved overseas to Egypt, where it was assigned to Ninth Air Force and participated in combat in the Mediterranean Theater of Operations in Egypt, Libya, Tunisia and Italy until April 1945.  After the end of World War II, it became part of the Army of Occupation until it was inactivated in 1947.

The group was activated again in 1955 as the 79th Fighter Group (Air Defense) as part of a program of Air Defense Command (ADC) to replace its air defense groups with fighter units with distinguished records in World War II.  It provided air defense of the Great Lakes region until it was inactivated in 1960.

In 1988, Tactical Air Command activated the 4443rd Test and Evaluation Group as an operational test unit at Eglin AFB, an Air Force Systems Command (AFSC) base that was home to AFSC's Armament Center.  In December 1991, as the USAF eliminated its Major Command controlled (MAJCON) four-digit units, the 79th was consolidated with the 4443rd, and the combined unit was designated the 79th Test and Evaluation Group.  In 1998, as a result of USAF policy that subordinate groups carry the same number as their parent wing, the 79th TEG was inactivated and replaced by the newly constituted 53rd Test and Evaluation Group.  In 1999, the unit moved from Eglin AFB to Nellis AFB, Less than two years later, USAF consolidated the 79th and 53rd TEGs to provide one continuous history to its weapons test and evaluation group.

The unit consists of seven squadrons, two detachments, and a named flight. Its mission is to manage the flying activities of the 53rd wing at Barksdale, Beale, Creech, Dyess, Edwards, Eglin, Nellis, and Whiteman Air Force bases.

Units
The group consists of seven squadrons, two direct detachments, and a named flight. These units perform tactical development, operational tests, and evaluations for Air Combat Command. In addition, the group assists the Air Force Operational Test and Evaluation Center with testing and operating the YAL-1 Airborne Laser, MQ-9, and F-35A.

Squadrons
 31st Test and Evaluation Squadron
 49th Test and Evaluation Squadron
 72d Test and Evaluation Squadron
 85th Test and Evaluation Squadron
 337th Test and Evaluation Squadron
 417th Test and Evaluation Squadron
 418th Test and Evaluation Squadron
 422d Test and Evaluation Squadron
 556th Test and Evaluation Squadron

Detachments
The group includes three detachments which are not part of the regular squadron structure:
Detachment 1 – Based at Edwards AFB, Detachment 1 performs operational test.
Detachment 2 – Based at Beale AFB, Detachment 2 performs evaluations of the Lockheed U-2 and RQ-4 Global Hawk and train personnel in the operation of the equipment.
Detachment 3 – Based at Nellis AFB, Detachment 3 trains and evaluates aircrews in the use of Foreign Materiel Exploitations for the Air Force Materiel Command.

Named flights
The group includes one named flight:
Combat Search and Rescue Combined Test Force – Based at Nellis AFB, the CSAR Combined Test Force currently operates the HH-60G Pave Hawk helicopter and Guardian Angel Weapons System in an attempt to consolidate all combat search and rescue operation efforts.

History

World War II
The group was constituted as 79th Pursuit Group (Interceptor) on 13 January 1942 and activated at Dale Mabry Field, Florida on 9 February 1942, drawing its personnel from the 56th and 81st Fighter Groups. its original squadrons were the 85th, 86th, and 87th Pursuit Squadrons. The group was redesignated the 79th Fighter Group (Single Engine) in May 1942. The group trained in the United States, then moved to Egypt by sea via Brazil in October–November 1942, where it became part of Ninth Air Force.

The group trained with P-40 Warhawks's while moving westward in the wake of the British drive across Egypt and Libya to Tunisia. Although many of the group's pilots flew combat missions with other organizations, the 79th group itself did not begin combat operations until March 1943. By escorting bombers, attacking enemy shipping, and supporting ground forces, the 79th took part in the Allied operations that defeated Axis forces in North Africa, captured Pantelleria, and conquered Sicily. The group was awarded a Distinguished Unit Citation (DUC) for its support of British Eighth Army during that period, March–August 1943.

The group was assigned to Twelfth Air Force in August 1943 and continued to support the British Eighth Army by attacking troop concentrations, gun positions, bridges, roads, and rail lines in southern Italy. It operated in the area of the Anzio beachhead, from January to March 1944. The group participated in the drive on Rome, from March to June 1944, and converted to P-47 Thunderbolts during that time. It flew escort and strafing missions in southern France during August and September 1944, and afterward returned to Italy and engaged in interdictory and close support operations in northern Italy. The group received a second DUC for numerous missions flown at minimum altitude in intense flak to help pierce the enemy line at the Santerno River in Italy in April 1945.

79th Ftr Gp

The group remained overseas as part of United States Air Forces in Europe after the war as part of the occupation force. It was transferred, without personnel and equipment, to the US in June 1947 and inactivated on 15 July 1947.

Air Defense Command

The group was redesignated the 79th Fighter Group (Air Defense), assigned to ADC and activated on 18 August 1955 at Youngstown MAP, Ohio as part of ADC's Project Arrow, which was designed to bring back on the active list the fighter units which had compiled memorable records in the two world wars. At Youngstown, the group assumed the personnel and equipment of the 502nd Air Defense Group, which was simultaneously inactivated. The group provided air defense over eastern Ohio as part of 30th Air Division of ADC's Central Air Defense Force and acted as the host unit for the Air Force portion of Youngstown MAP.  The 79th was assigned several support organizations to fulfill this responsibility. One of the group's original components, the 86th Fighter-Interceptor Squadron (FIS), flying radar equipped and rocket armed North American F-86D Sabres was already stationed at Youngstown and transferred from the 502nd.

In September 1957 the 86th FIS traded its Sabres for Convair F-102 Delta Dagger aircraft equipped with data link for interception control through the Semi-Automatic Ground Environment system. The Air Force transferred command of Youngstown MAP from ADC to Continental Air Command on 1 March 1960 and the 79th Fighter Group and its components inactivated that date.

Lineage 
79th Test and Evaluation Group
 Constituted as 79th Pursuit Group (Interceptor) on 13 January 1942
 Activated on 9 February 1942
 Redesignated 79th Fighter Group (Single Engine) in May 1942
 Inactivated on 15 July 1947
 Redesignated as 79th Fighter Group (Air Defense) on 20 June 1955
 Activated on 18 August 1955
 Inactivated on 1 March 1960
 Redesignated 79th Tactical Fighter Group on 31 July 1985 (remained inactive)
 Redesignated 79th Test and Evaluation Group on 1 December 1991
 Consolidated with 4443rd Test and Evaluation Group on 15 December 1991
 Inactivated on 20 November 1998
 Consolidated on 25 June 2000 with 53rd Test and Evaluation Group as 53rd Test and Evaluation Group

4443rd Test and Evaluation Group
 Designated as 4443rd Test and Evaluation Group and activated on 1 July 1988
 Consolidated with 79th Test and Evaluation Group on 15 December 1991 as 79th Test and Evaluation Group

53rd Test and Evaluation Group
 Constituted as 53rd Test and Evaluation Group and activated on 20 November 1998
 Consolidated on 25 June 2000 with 79th Test and Evaluation Group

Assignments 
 Third Air Force, 9 February 1942
 I Fighter Command, 22 June 1942
 Boston Fighter Wing, 1 August 1942 – 28 September 1942
 Ninth Air Force, 18 November 1942 (attached to No. 7 Wing, South African Air Force (SAAF) from 21 February 1943)
 IX Fighter Command, 24 February 1943 (remained attached to No. 7 Wing, SAAF until ca. 2 June 1943, attached to XII Air Support Command to 14 June 1943, No. 7 Wing SAAF)
 Twelfth Air Force, 21 August 1943 (attached to Northwest African Tactical Air Force (NWATAF))
 XII Air Support Command, 1 September 1943 (remained attached to NWATAF)
 57th Bombardment Wing, 1 November 1943 – 1 January 1944 (remained attached to NWATAF until 17 January 1944, attached to 64th Fighter Wing 18 January 1944 – 10 February 1944 and 27 February 1944 – 20 April 1944, 87th Fighter Wing 11 June 1944 – 19 September 1944)
 XII Fighter Command, 20 September 1944 (attached to 64th Fighter Wing 20 September 1944 – 30 September 1944
 Twelfth Air Force, 1 October 1944 (attached to Desert Air Force 1 October 1944 – 9 May 1945, XXII Tactical Air Command, 12 May 1945 – 7 June 1945
 70th Fighter Wing, 31 July 1945
 Tactical Air Command, 25 June 1947 – 15 July 1947
 4708th Air Defense Wing, 18 August 1955
 30th Air Division, 8 July 1956
 Detroit Air Defense Sector, 1 April 1959 – 1 March 1960
 USAF Tactical Air Warfare Center (later USAF Air Warfare Center, 53rd Wing), 1 July 1988 – 20 November 1998, 20 November 1998 – present

Components 

 85th Pursuit Squadron (later 85th Fighter Squadron, 4485th Test and Evaluation Squadron, 85th Test and Evaluation Squadron): 9 February 1942 – 15 July 1947, 1 August 1988 – present
 86th Pursuit Squadron (later 86th Fighter Squadron, 86th Fighter-Interceptor Squadron): 9 February 1942 – 15 July 1947; 18 August 1955 – 1 March 1960
 87th Pursuit Squadron (later 87th Fighter Squadron): 9 February 1942 – 15 July 1947
 99th Fighter Squadron: 16 October 1943 – 1 April 1944 (Attached)
 316th Fighter Squadron: 15 March 1943 – 21 May 1943 (Attached)

Support Units
 79th USAF Infirmary (later 79th USAF Dispensary), 18 August 1955 – 1 March 1960
 79th Air Base Squadron, 18 August 1955 – 1 March 1960
 79th Consolidated Aircraft Maintenance Squadron, ca. 8 July 1957 – 1 March 1960
 79th Materiel Squadron, 18 August 1955 –  1 March 1960

Test Units
 31st Test and Evaluation Squadron, 15 April 1993 – present
 Edwards Air Force Base, California
 49th Test Squadron (later 49th Test and Evaluation Squadron), 15 April 1993 – present
 Barksdale Air Force Base, Louisiana
 72nd Test and Evaluation Squadron, 20 November 1998 – present
 Whiteman Air Force Base, Missouri
 417th Test and Evaluation Squadron, 24 April 2018 – present
 Edwards Air Force Base, California
 422nd Test and Evaluation Squadron, 1 August 1997 – present
 Nellis Air Force Base, Nevada
 4486th Fighter Weapons Squadron, 1 October 1988 - 30 November 1991
 HH-60G Combined Test Force (later Combat Rescue Combined Test Force), 1 October 2002 – present

Stations 

 Dale Mabry Field, Florida, 9 February 1942
 Morris Field, North Carolina c. 1 May 1942
 Hillsgrove Army Air Field, Rhode Island ca. 22 June 1942
 Bedford Army Air Field, Massachusetts 2 July – 28 September 1942
 Egypt 18 November 1942
 Al Amirya (Landing Ground LG-174), Egypt 19 November 1942
 Gazala, Libya (Landing Ground LG-150), 14 January 1943
 Daraugh North Landing Ground Libya, 7 February 1943
 Castel Benito Airdrome, Libya, 27 March 1943
 Causeway Airdrome, Tunisia 13 March 1943
 Sidi El Hani Landing Ground, Tunisia, 17 April 1943
 El Haouaria Airfield, Tunisia, 2 June 1943
 Bou Grara Airfield, Tunisia, 6 June 1943
 Causeway Airdrome, Tunisia 14 June 1943
 Syracuse, Sicily, Italy 16 July 1943
 Cassibile Landing Ground, Sicily, Italy, 26 July 1943
 Palagonia Landing Ground, Sicily, Italy, 30 July 1943
 Isole Landing Ground, Sicily, Italy, 13 September 1943

 Pisticci Landing Ground, Italy, 24 September 1943
 Penny Post Landing Ground, Italy 26 September 1943
 Salsola Airfield (Foggia No. 3), Italy 4 October 1943
 Madna Airfield, Italy 19 November 1943
 Capodichino Airport, Naples, Italy, 15 January 1944
 Pomigliano Airfield, Italy 1 May 1944 – 17 June 1944
 Serragia Airfield, Corsica 20 June 1944
 St. Raphael/Frejus Airfield (Y-12), France c. 25 August 1944
 Valance Airfield (Y-23), France, 30 September 1944
 Iesi Airfield, Italy c. 4 October 1944
 Fano Airfield, Italy c. 5 December 1944
 Cesenatico Airfield, Italy 20 March 1945
 AAF Station Hoersching (later Hoersching Air Base), Austria, 22 July 1945 – 25 June 1947
 Langley Field, Virginia, 25 June 1947 –  15 July 1947
 Youngstown Municipal Airport, Ohio, 18 August 1955 – 1 March 1960
 Eglin AFB, Florida, 1 July 1988
 Nellis AFB, Nevada, 17 June 1999 – present

Awards and Campaigns

Aircraft

 Curtiss P-40 Warhawk, 1942
 Republic P-47 Thunderbolt, 1942–1945
 North American F-86D Sabre, 1955
 Convair F-102A Delta Dagger, 1955–1960
 Fairchild Republic A-10 Thunderbolt II
 Rockwell B-1 Lancer
 Boeing B-52 Stratofortress
 McDonnell Douglas F-15 Eagle C & E
 General Dynamics F-16 Fighting Falcon
 Lockheed Martin F-22 Raptor
 Sikorsky HH-60 Pave Hawk
 General Atomics MQ-1 Predator

Additionally, the group has flying hours assigned to the B-2 Spirit bomber, RQ-4 Global Hawk, and Lockheed U-2.

See also
 53rd Wing
 List of United States Air Force Groups
 United States Air Force
 Aerospace Defense Command Fighter Squadrons

References

Notes
 Explanatory notes

 Citations

Bibliography

 Buss, Lydus H.(ed), Sturm, Thomas A., Volan, Denys, and McMullen, Richard F., History of Continental Air Defense Command and Air Defense Command July to December 1955, Directorate of Historical Services, Air Defense Command, Ent AFB, CO, (1956)

Further reading
 Coles, Harry C., (1945) Ninth Air Force in the Western Desert Campaign to 23 January 1943, USAF Historical Study No. 30
 Coles, Harry C., (1945) Participation by the Ninth and Twelfth Air Forces in the Sicilian Campaign, USAF Historical Study No. 37
 
 Woerpel, Don. The 79th Fighter Group: Over Tunisia, Sicily, and Italy in World War II. Atglen, Pennsylvania: Schiffer Publishing, 2007. .

0053
Military units and formations in Nevada
Military units and formations established in 1942